= Eureta =

The European Association of Practice-oriented Professionals with Higher Education (EurEta) is a non-profit, non-political organisation formed to set European qualification standards for higher engineering and technical professionals and to keep a European Register of these professionals. EurEta is a sister organization to FEANI the federation of professional engineers that unites national engineering associations from 32 European countries.

EurEta works with other European, international and national organisations for the benefit of all engineering professionals and the public they serve.

An engineer registered with EurEta is called a "EurEta Registered Engineer" and has the right to use the title "Ing. EurEta". Nationally acknowledged titles of registered professionals shall not be affected by the EurEta title.
